God's Favorite Sons is the debut EP by Canadian hard rock band Organ Thieves (then known as The Organ Thieves), self-produced and released in March 2009.

The EP includes 5 first demo songs recorded by the band in Jesse Smith and Jason Bone's studio "The Boom Cave" in Oshawa, Ontario, in January 2009. The EP was co-produced by the band and former Cauterize bassist Jason Bone.

The music on the EP ranges from simple hard rock to more bass-driven reggae tracks, as well as more country and blues influenced southern rock songs.

The songs "Fix the Hearts of the Hollow" and "Question Your Crown" were later re-recorded for the band's first full-length album Somewhere Between Free Men and Slaves, which was released in 2012.

Track listing

Personnel
Chuck Coles - lead vocals, guitar
Dave Baksh - guitar
Ben Davies - guitar, mandolin
Mike Smith – bass
John Owens – drums, percussion

2009 EPs
Hard rock EPs
Organ Thieves albums